Roar (trademarked as ROAR) is the name of a wooden roller coaster at Six Flags America located near Upper Marlboro, Maryland. There were originally two roller coasters; the first and current ride was built in 1998 at Six Flags America, and a second ride was built in 1999 at Six Flags Discovery Kingdom. Both rides were designed and built by Great Coasters International (GCI). In 2015, Discovery Kingdom announced the retirement of its version of Roar, which Rocky Mountain Construction later renovated and transformed into The Joker, a hybrid roller coaster.

Design and operation

The ride is a wooden roller coaster with a chain lift hill system. It features a unique "Speed Shed" element over a large section of track, designed to enhance the sense of speed without the visual sensory loss of a traditional tunnel. Of the two trains used on the ride, each one seats a capacity of 24 people in six cars and utilize both seat belts and lap bars. Unlike classic out and back rides, Roar is a twister design.

Six Flags America
Six Flags America's Roar, called Roar (East) by GCI, was built in 1998. The longer track length is due to the ride's location on a slanting hillside, and longer drops on the station side and lift hill. Its trains, designed and maintained by Philadelphia Toboggan Coasters, are also different. Roar is one of the three rides at Six Flags America that featured an on-ride camera (the others being Superman: Ride of Steel and Apocalypse). It has been removed along with the camera on Apocalypse. The camera for Apocalypse returned and was re-added for the 2019 transition to Firebird. The ride is situated in the park's Chesapeake themed section.

Six Flags Discovery Kingdom

Six Flags Discovery Kingdom's Roar, called Roar (West) by GCI, was built in 1999 in light of adding the Six Flags moniker to the Marine World amusement park. At , this coaster was shorter than the installation at Six Flags America.  The ride consisted of two 12 car Millennium Flyer trains. This type of train helps give the sensation of a steel roller coaster utilizing the classic wooden style design. Roar was situated in the Sky animal-themed area of the park. It closed on August 16, 2015.

On July 16, 2015, Six Flags Discovery Kingdom announced that Roar would be retired on August 16, 2015. The closure marked the completion of the attraction's seventeenth season. Park president Don McCoy released a statement that the ride was being removed to make room for future expansion. An estimated 11 million visitors to the park have ridden the roller coaster since its debut in 1999. On September 3, 2015, Six Flags announced that the Roar at Six Flags Discovery Kingdom would be transformed into a "wood-steel hybrid" named The Joker featuring three inversions. Rocky Mountain Construction performed the conversion, opening the new version on May 28, 2016.

Awards

References
General

Specific

External links

Roar at Six Flags America
Great Coasters International

Roller coasters operated by Six Flags
Roller coasters in Maryland
Former roller coasters in California
Six Flags Discovery Kingdom
Six Flags America
Roller coasters manufactured by Great Coasters International

de:Roar (Six Flags America)